The 2014–15 Rubin Kazan' season was the 12th successive season that the club will play in the Russian Premier League, the highest tier of association football in Russia. Rubin Kazan will also be taking part in the Russian Cup.

Squad

Out on loan

Transfers

Summer

In:

Out:

Winter

In:

Out:

Competitions

Russian Premier League

Results by round

Matches

League table

Russian Cup

Squad statistics

Appearances and goals

|-
|colspan="14"|Players away from the club on loan:

|-
|colspan="14"|Players who appeared for Rubin Kazan' no longer at the club:

|}

Goal Scorers

Disciplinary record

Notes
 MSK time changed from UTC+4 to UTC+3 permanently on 26 October 2014.

References

FC Rubin Kazan seasons
Rubin Kazan